Clavatula christianae is a species of sea snail, a marine gastropod mollusk in the family Clavatulidae.

Distribution
This marine species occurs in the Atlantic Ocean off West Africa.

References

 Nolf F. (2011) Clavatula christianae, a new turrid from West Africa (Mollusca: Gastropoda: Clavatulidae). Neptunea 10(2): 24–32
 

christianae
Gastropods described in 2011